Trygve is a masculine given name most common in Norway. Trygve is derived from the Old Norse tryggr, meaning "true, trustworthy", cognate with Old English treowe, Old High German triuwe. Gothic has triggws.
The Icelandic, Faroese and Old Norse form of the name is Tryggvi, e.g. Tryggve Olafsson.

There are 5,951 people with the forename Trygve in Norway in 2009, declining to 5,432 in November 2015.

The following people share the forename Trygve:
 Trygve Bendiksby (1907–1992), Norwegian judge
 Trygve Berge (born 1932), Norwegian Olympic downhill skier
 Trygve Bjørgo (1916–1997), Norwegian poet and educator
 Trygve Bornø (born 1942), Norwegian footballer
 Trygve Braarud (1903–1985), Norwegian botanist
 Trygve Bratteli (1910–1984), Norwegian Prime Minister
 Trygve Brodahl (1905–1996), Norwegian cross-country skier
 Trygve Brudevold (1920–2021), Norwegian bobsledder
 Trygve Bruvik (born 1952), Norwegian engineer
 Trygve Bull (1905–1999), Norwegian lecturer and politician
 Trygve Christoffer Busch (1920-1999), Norwegian war hero
 Trygve Bøyesen (1886–1963), Norwegian gymnast
 Trygve Dalseg (1898–1987), Norwegian marketing agent
 Trygve Allister Diesen (born 1967), Norwegian film producer and director
 Trygve Gulbranssen (1894–1962), Norwegian novelist
 Trygve Haavelmo (1911–1999), Norwegian economist and Nobel Prize laureate 
 Trygve Haugeland (1914–1998), Norwegian politician
 Trygve Helgaker (born 1953), Norwegian professor
 Trygve Hoff (1895–1982), Norwegian businessman and magazine editor
 Trygve Daniel Holmedal (born 1999), Norwegian physicist
 Trygve Johannessen (born 1953), Norwegian footballer
 V. Trygve Jordahl (1898–1984), American bishop
 Trygve Knudsen (1897–1968), Norwegian philologist
 Trygve de Lange (1918–1981), Norwegian lawyer
 Trygve Lie (1896–1968), Norwegian politician and first United Nations Secretary General
 Trygve Moe (born 1927), Norwegian journalist
 Trygve Moe (1920–1998), Norwegian politician
 Trygve Nagell (1895–1988), Norwegian mathematician
 Trygve Nilsen (1893–1973), Norwegian politician
 Trygve Nygaard (born 1975), Norwegian footballer
 Trygve Olsen (1921–1979), Norwegian politician
 Trygve Owren (1912–1987), Norwegian politician
 Trygve Pedersen (1884–1967), Norwegian sailor
 Trygve Reenskaug (born 1930), Norwegian computer scientist and professor
 Trygve Rovelstad (1903–1990), American sculptor
 Trygve Røed-Larsen (born 1939), Norwegian physicist
 Trygve Schjøtt (1882–1960), Norwegian sailor
 Trygve Seim, Norwegian jazz saxophonist
 Trygve Simonsen (1937–2011), Norwegian politician
 Trygve Stangeland (1934–2011), Norwegian businessman
 Trygve Stokstad (1902–1979), Norwegian boxer
 Trygve Utheim (1884–1952), Norwegian politician
 Trygve Slagsvold Vedum (born 1978), Norwegian politician
 Trygve Wiese (born 1985), Norwegian singer
 Trygve Wyller (born 1950), Norwegian theologian

References

Masculine given names
Norwegian masculine given names